The Cresson Traveling Scholarship, also known as the William Emlen Cresson Memorial Traveling Scholarship, is a two-year scholarship for foreign travel and/or study awarded annually to art students at the Pennsylvania Academy of the Fine Arts in Philadelphia, Pennsylvania.

Awarded for excellence, the prize was funded by Emlen and Priscilla Cresson in memory of their son William Emlen Cresson, an Academy alumnus who died in 1868 at the age of 23.  He had been a child prodigy painter who began exhibiting at the Academy at the age of 11.

The first Cresson Traveling Scholarships were awarded in 1902. Initially, they were $1,000 one-year scholarships, renewable for a second year, and sometimes beyond. Multiple awards were given in painting, along with one in sculpture and one in architecture. Awards in illustration were added later.

Cresson European Scholarships of $5000 for summer travel, were also awarded annually. These were not as prestigious as the two-year scholarships, with which they are often confused. 

Laura Wheeler Waring, the first African-American woman to win a Cresson Traveling Scholarship, was studying in Paris in 1914 when World War I broke out. Subsequent winners were allowed to postpone their travel until the conflict was over.

Scholarship winners

Henry R. Rittenberg (painting), 1902 
Louis Betts (painting), 1903, 1904
Martha Walter (painting), 1903, 1904
Emilie Zeckwer (painting), 1903, 1904
Giuseppe Donato (sculpture), 1903, 1904
Gilbert L. Hindermyer (architecture), 1903, 1904
Alice V. Corson (painting), 1904, 1905
E. H. Allerton  (painting), 1903, 1904
Ella Sophonisba Hergesheimer (painting), 1904, 1905
Morris Molarsky (painting), 1904, 1905
Charles Frederick Ramsey (painting), 1904, 1905
F. Hutton Shill (painting), 1904, 1905
Albert Laessle (sculpture), 1904, 1905
Phineas Paist (architecture), 1904, 1905
Arthur B. Carles (painting), 1905, 1906, 1907
Daniel Garber (painting), 1905, 1906
Victor H. Zoll (sculpture), 1905, 1906
William E. Groban (architecture), 1905, 1906
Clarence K. Hinkle (painting), 1906, 1907
John M. Bateman (sculpture), 1906, 1907
Warden H. Fenton (architecture), 1906, 1907
Lawrence Saint (painting), 1907
Thomas Harlan Ellett (architecture), 1907 
C. Edgar Cope (architecture), 1907 
Nina B. Ward (painting), 1908, 1909, 1911
Robert Rodes McGoodwin (architecture), 1908
Cornelia Barns (painting), 1909, 1910
Beatrice Fenton (sculpture), 1909, 1910
Leopold Seyffert, 1910, 1911, 1912
Donald Blake
Craig Johns, 1911
Katherine Southwick, 1911, 1912
Gertrude A. Lambert, 1912, 1913
Elsa  Jemne, 1914, 1915
Laura Wheeler Waring (painting), 1914, 1915
Edith McMurtrie
Charles Skinner Garner, 1916, 1917
Roy Cleveland Nuse, 1917, 1918
Clarence Johnson (painting), 1917. Travel deferred until 1920 because of his service in World War I.
Sue May Westcott Gill
Walter W. Josephs (painting), 1918
Delphine Bradt (painting), 1918
Raphael Sabatini (sculpture), 1918
Otto Gatter (illustration), 1918
Elmer G. Anderson (painting), 1919
Sara Carles (painting), 1919
Wayne K. Crumling (painting), 1919
Edith W. Dallas (painting), 1919
Elise Fullerton (painting), 1919
Catharine Harley Grant (painting), 1919
Helene Holdt (painting), 1919
Julian Levi (painting), 1919
Mabel Pugh (painting), 1919
Tokio Ueyama (painting), 1919
Bernard Gordon (sculpture), 1919
Jean Knox (illustration), 1919
Abraham Rattner (illustration), 1919
Alfred R. Mitchell, 1920
Morris Blackburn,
Gladys Edgerly Bates, 1921 
Arthur Meltzer, 1921 
Barse Miller (painting), 1922, 1923
Walker Hancock (sculpture), 1922, 1923 
Margaret Brisbine, 1923
Walter Inglis Anderson, 1927
Benton Murdoch Spruance, 1928
Joseph Plavcan, 1928
Robert Cronbach, 1929, 1930
Charles W. Ward, 1930
 Dacre F. Boulton, 1931, 1932
Alvyn Boyd Cruise
Charles M. West, Jr., 1934
Roswell Weidner, 1935
Jack Delano, 1936
Geraldine Funk (Alvarez) 
Dorothy Gilman Butters, 1944
Raymond Saunders, 1956
Charles Searles
Elizabeth Osborne
Barkley L. Hendricks, 1966
Robert Bender, 1973
Jill A. Rupinski, 1976
Bo Bartlett, 1980
 James P. Repenning, 1980
Douglas Martenson, 1981
Vincent Desiderio, 1982
Peter Groesbeck
Andrea Packard
Orit Hofshi, 1989

References

Pennsylvania Academy of the Fine Arts
Awards established in 1902
1902 establishments in Pennsylvania
Visual arts awards